WFRB is a country formatted broadcast radio station licensed to Frostburg, Maryland, United States.

Due to WFRB's low position on the dial, it covers most of Western Maryland, the Potomac Highlands of West Virginia, and parts of Southern Pennsylvania.  WFRB is owned and operated by Forever Media, through licensee FM Radio Licenses, LLC.

Programming
Mornings were led by Quinn and Rose from nearby Pittsburgh station WPGB.  Syndicated programs from Glenn Beck, Rush Limbaugh, and Dennis Miller are also heard.  Saturday programming, and programming after 7PM on weekdays consists of shows syndicated from the Fox Radio Network such as John Gibson, Alan Colms, and "Kilmeade and Friends". On Sundays, religious broadcasts are aired from 7AM to Noon, followed and preceded by talk shows from the Fox Radio Network.

Sports broadcasts by WFRB are syndicated from their sister station WTBO and consist of the Pittsburgh Penguins, Pittsburgh Steelers, and the Baltimore Orioles. In addition to these major league teams, WFRB serves as the home station for Mountain Ridge High School Football, broadcasting all home and away games during the season. All sports broadcasts override the normal talk show programming, but are not available when you are listening online. On June 1, 2018, WFRB flipped to Classic Country as "Willie 106.7/560".

Previous logo

References

External links
Willie 106.7/560 Online

Frostburg, Maryland
FRB (AM)
Radio stations established in 1980
1980 establishments in Maryland
Country radio stations in the United States